Tank Wash is a wash in Tooele County, Utah.

References 

Great Salt Lake Desert
Rivers of Tooele County, Utah